Last Plane to Baalbek (also known as Operation Baalbeck) is a 1964 Eurospy film directed by Marcello Giannini and Hugo Fregonese. It is a coproduction between Italy (where the film is known as F.B.I. operazione Baalbeck or La moneta spezzata), France (where it was released as Dernier avion pour Baalbeck) and Lebanon.

Cast 
 
Rossana Podestà as Isabel Moore 
Jacques Sernas as Nicholas 'Nick' Mann 
George Sanders as Prince Makowski
Folco Lulli as John Volpi
Leopoldo Trieste as Pagani
Yoko Tani as Asia
Miranda Martino as the Singer

References

External links

 

1964 films
1960s spy films
1960s adventure films
Italian spy films
French spy films
Films directed by Hugo Fregonese
Lebanese drama films
French aviation films
English-language French films
English-language Italian films
Italian aviation films
1960s French films
1960s Italian films